Lelea Paea (born 6 January 1983 in Sydney, New South Wales) is a former Tonga international rugby league footballer. He previously played for Coca-Cola West Red Sparks rugby union in Japan. He usually plays centre, but has played in wing at times throughout his career.

Background
Lelea Paea was born in Sydney, New South Wales, Australia. He is the elder brother of Mickey Paea and Lopini Paea.

Career
Lelea Paea is a Tongan international.

In 2007, Paea was one of the inaugural members of the newly admitted Gold Coast Titans side, signing with the new club after three seasons with the Sydney Roosters.

References

1983 births
Australian rugby union players
Australian rugby league players
Australian sportspeople of Tongan descent
Tonga national rugby league team players
Sydney Roosters players
Gold Coast Titans players
Rugby league wingers
Rugby league centres
Rugby league fullbacks
Expatriate rugby union players in Japan
Australian expatriate rugby union players
Living people
Coca-Cola Red Sparks players
Rugby league players from Sydney
Australian expatriate sportspeople in Japan